The 2008 Guadiana Trophy competition took place between 25–27 July 2008 and featured Benfica, Sporting Clube de Portugal, and Blackburn Rovers. Sporting won in the final match against rivals Benfica.

Matches

Day 1

Day 2

Day 3

2008–09
2008–09 in Portuguese football
2008–09 in English football